Michelle Desbarats is a Canadian poet.

Born in Winnipeg, Manitoba, she lives in Ottawa, Ontario.

Desbarats was a finalist in the CBC/Saturday Night National Poetry Contest. In 1998, her first book of poetry, Last Child to Come Inside, was published by Carleton University Press. She has also received the Ontario Arts Council-Works in Progress grant.

External links
 http://www.banffcentre.ca/press/contributors/def/fels_md/

Canadian women poets
Writers from Ottawa
Writers from Winnipeg
Living people
Franco-Manitoban people
20th-century Canadian poets
20th-century Canadian women writers
Year of birth missing (living people)